Jimmy Briffa (born 23 September 1948, in Malta) was a professional footballer and manager. During his career, he played as a defender for the Sliema Wanderers. He later went on to coach Balzan Youths, Marsaxlokk, Floriana, Marsa, and Senglea Athletic.

References

1948 births
Living people
Maltese footballers
Malta international footballers
Sliema Wanderers F.C. players
Maltese football managers
Balzan F.C. managers
Marsaxlokk F.C. managers
Floriana F.C. managers
Mqabba F.C. managers
St. Andrews F.C. managers
Association football defenders